Positive is the sixth extended play from South Korean boy band Pentagon. It was released on April 2, 2018, by Cube Entertainment. The album consists of six tracks, including the title track "Shine".

Positive is the last Korean EP to feature E'Dawn due to his hiatus and subsequent departure from the group.

After seven months and nine days, on November 11, "Shine" music video surpassed 100 million combined views for the official music video uploaded on 1theK's channel and PENTAGON's official channel.

Commercial performance
The EP debuted at number seven on the Korean Gaon Chart in April 2018, and peaked at number six the following month.

Track listing

Accolades

Charts

References

2018 EPs
Cube Entertainment EPs
Pentagon (South Korean band) EPs
Kakao M EPs
Korean-language EPs
Albums produced by Hui (singer)
Albums produced by Kino (singer)